The Bregman method is an iterative algorithm to solve certain convex optimization problems involving regularization. The original version is due to Lev M. Bregman, who published it in 1967.

The algorithm is a row-action method accessing constraint functions one by one and the method is particularly suited for large optimization problems where constraints can be efficiently enumerated. The algorithm works particularly well for regularizers such as the  norm, where it converges very quickly because of an error cancellation effect.

Algorithm 

The algorithm starts with a pair of primal and dual variables.  Then, for each constraint a generalized projection onto its feasible set is performed, updating both the constraint's dual variable and all primal variables for which there are non-zero coefficients in the constraint functions gradient.  In case the objective is strictly convex and all constraint functions are convex, the limit of this iterative projection converges to the optimal primal dual pair.

In the case of a basis pursuit-type problem , the Bregman method is equivalent to ordinary gradient descent on the dual problem .

Applications 
The Bregman method or its generalizations can be applied to:

 Image deblurring or denoising (including total variation denoising)
 MR image reconstruction
Magnetic resonance imaging
Radar
Hyperspectral imaging
 Compressed sensing
Least absolute deviations or -regularized linear regression
Covariance selection (learning a sparse covariance matrix)
Matrix completion
Structural risk minimization

Generalizations and drawbacks 
The method has links to the method of multipliers  and dual ascent method (through the so-called Bregman alternating direction method of multipliers, generalizing the alternating direction method of multipliers) and multiple generalizations exist.

One drawback of the method is that it is only provably convergent if the objective function is strictly convex. In case this can not be ensured, as for linear programs or non-strictly convex quadratic programs, additional methods such as proximal gradient methods have been developed. In the case of the Rudin-Osher-Fatemi model of image denoising, the Bregman method provably converges.

Some generalizations of the Bregman method include:

 Inverse scale space method
 Linearized Bregman
 Logistic Bregman
 Split Bregman

Linearized Bregman 
The result is much more computationally tractable, especially in basis pursuit-type problems.

Sometimes, when running the Linearized Bregman method, there are periods of "stagnation" where the residual is almost constant. To alleviate this issue, one can use the Linearized Bregman method with kicking, where one essentially detects the beginning of a stagnation period, then predicts and skips to the end of it.

Since Linearized Bregman is mathematically equivalent to gradient descent, it can be accelerated with methods to accelerate gradient descent, such as line search, L-BGFS, Barzilai-Borwein steps, or the Nesterov method; the last has been proposed as the accelerated linearized Bregman method.

Split Bregman 
We start by rewriting it as the constrained optimization problem , then relax it into  where  is a constant. By defining , one reduces the problem to one that can be solved with the ordinary Bregman algorithm.

The Split Bregman method has been generalized to optimization over complex numbers using Wirtinger derivatives.

References 

Optimization algorithms and methods
Convex optimization